Tewfik Mishlawi (1935 – 24 January 2012) was a veteran Lebanese journalist who was well known in the Middle East and Arab world.

Early life and career 
Born 1935 in Haifa, British Mandate Palestine, Mishlawi fled to Lebanon with his family during the 1948 Palestinian exodus. Eventually becoming a naturalized Lebanese, Mishlawi studied economics at the American University of Beirut (AUB).

He is survived by his wife Phillipa, their son Nadim, and Nadim's son Karim, as well as two children from a previous marriage.

Mishlawi did a good deal of research work in the field of journalism, involving such topics as foreign perceptions of the American news media and journalism from a third world perspective, among other things.

From 1963 to 1973, Mishlawi was deputy editor in chief of The Daily Star, Lebanon's only English language daily newspaper. From 1973 to 1976, he worked as a staff reporter for the Beirut Bureau of the United Press International. From 1973 to 1985, he was Special Middle East correspondent for The Wall Street Journal, providing hard news, analysis, and features. From 1977 to 1979, he was ad hoc correspondent for BusinessWeek in New York City. From 1980 to 1983 he was special correspondent for The Times in London, providing hard news. From 1985 to 1992, he was director of training at the Center for Foreign Journalists in Reston, Virginia.

Since returning to Lebanon in 1992, he had continued working on his own periodical, the Middle East Reporter (MER), a media digest that would translate and sum up the Arabic press for foreign diplomats and academics. He also conducted a number of workshops to train journalists during this period.

Many who knew Tewfik Mishlawi considered him an honest and serious journalist committed to impartial reporting, something that was not an easy task in the Arab World in view of the region's recurrent instability and conflicting political loyalties.

References

External links
Dailystar.com.lb
Pressgazette.co.uk
Icfj.org
Independent.co.uk

Palestinian journalists
2012 deaths
1935 births
Lebanese journalists